Michael Eric Mitchell (born April 4, 1967) is an American former professional basketball player. He holds an Irish passport and played for the Irish national team in the early 2000s.

Early life
Mitchell was born in Los Angeles, California, and attended Mater Dei High School in Santa Ana, California. After graduating, he attended Fresno State University from 1985 to 1988 before transferring to Colorado State where he played one final season in 1989–90.

Professional career

Australia
Mitchell was the second overall pick in the 1990 CBA draft before moving to Australia.

Mitchell played in the National Basketball League (NBL) between 1991 and 1997 with the Gold Coast Rollers (1991–94), Brisbane Bullets (1995–96) and North Melbourne Giants (1997).

During the 1992 season, Mitchell suffered an horrific injury when he smashed his right arm in anger against a wire-reinforced glass panel of a locker-room door after Gold Coast narrowly lost away to the Illawarra Hawks. With his arm almost severed, Mitchell was found slumped on the floor in a pool of blood by Rollers teammate Ron Radliff. Doubt was initially cast over whether Mitchell would ever play again.

Europe
Between 1997 and 1999, Mitchell played in Germany for Dragons Rhöndorf. After a seasons in France with Besançon BCD, he returned to Germany in 2000 and played the next four seasons for Gießen 46ers. He was unable to play in the 2004–05 season due to injury and subsequently retired in 2005.

National team career
Mitchell debuted for the Ireland national basketball team in 2001. He played for Ireland in 2003 at the European Championship.

Coaching career
Mitchell began his coaching career in 2005, first as assistant coach at the University of California, Riverside for two years, and then as head coach for the Ramona High School boys' basketball team. In 2008, he joined the Chicago Sky of the WNBA as an assistant coach.

Personal life
Mitchell met his now ex-wife in Australia in the 1990s. She was also American but had Irish heritage as her grandparents were born in Ireland. Mitchell gained an Irish passport through marriage.

Mitchell has two children, Donovan and Myca. His son is also a professional basketball player.

References

External links
 Bundesliga profile 

1967 births
Living people
American expatriate basketball people in Australia
American expatriate basketball people in France
American expatriate basketball people in Germany
American men's basketball coaches
American men's basketball players
American women's basketball coaches
Basketball coaches from California
Basketball players from Los Angeles
Besançon BCD players
Brisbane Bullets players
Chicago Sky coaches
Colorado State Rams men's basketball players
Forwards (basketball)
Fresno State Bulldogs men's basketball players
Giessen 46ers players
Gold Coast Rollers players
High school basketball coaches in the United States
Irish men's basketball players
North Melbourne Giants players
UC Riverside Highlanders men's basketball coaches